The Prehistoric Man is a 1924 British silent comedy film directed by A. E. Coleby and starring George Robey, Marie Blanche and H. Agar Lyons.

Cast
 George Robey as He-of-the Beetle Brow  
 Marie Blanche as She-of-the Permanent-Wave  
 H. Agar Lyons as He-of-the-Clutching-Hand  
 W. G. Saunders as He-of-the-Knotty-Joints 
 Johnny Butt as He-of-the-Cedar-Mop  
 Elsie Marriott-Watson as She-of-the-Tireless-Tongue  
 Laurie Leslie as He-of-the-Matted-Beaver

References

Bibliography
 Goble, Alan. The Complete Index to Literary Sources in Film. Walter de Gruyter, 1999.
 Low, Rachael. The History of the British Film 1918-1929. George Allen & Unwin, 1971.

External links
 

1924 films
1924 comedy films
British comedy films
British silent feature films
Films directed by A. E. Coleby
British black-and-white films
1920s English-language films
1920s British films
Silent comedy films